North 2 West is a regional English rugby union league at the seventh tier of club rugby union for teams from Cheshire, Cumbria, Merseyside, Lancashire and Greater Manchester.  The division was introduced for the 2019-20 season to form a new league at tier 7 - meaning that Lancs/Cheshire 1 would drop to being a tier 8 league.  

Promoted teams enter North 1 West while relegated teams typically drop down to Lancs/Cheshire 1 or Cumbria.  Each season teams from North 2 West are picked to take part in the RFU Intermediate Cup (a national competition for clubs at level 7).

Teams 2021–22

The teams competing in 2021-22 achieved their places in the league based on performances in 2019-20, the 'previous season' column in the table below refers to that season not 2020-21. 

Outgoing teams were Manchester and Glossop who were promoted to North 2 West whilst Eccles (11th) and Sefton (12th) would have been relegated to Lancs/Cheshire 1 but instead withdrew from the RFU leagues to join the Lancashire ADM competition, as did Aspull who finished in 8th position. Also departed are Aspatria who were level transferred to Durham/Northumberland 1 meaning the league has been reduced from 14 to 13.

Season 2020–21

On 30 October 2020 the RFU announced  that due to the coronavirus pandemic a decision had been taken to cancel Adult Competitive Leagues (National League 1 and below) for the 2020/21 season meaning North 2 West was not contested.

Teams 2019–20

North 2 West honours

Number of league titles

Manchester (1)

See also
Cheshire RFU
Lancashire RFU
English rugby union system
Rugby union in England

Notes

References

7
Rugby union in Lancashire
Rugby union in Cheshire